Smyriodes is a genus of moths in the family Geometridae first described by Achille Guenée in 1857. Both species are known from Australia.

Species
Smyriodes aplectaria Guenée, 1857
Smyriodes trigramma (Lower, 1892)

References

Nacophorini